Sri Narayani Hospital & Research Centre is a  general hospital located near the famous Sri Lakshmi Golden Temple in the city of Vellore, Tamil Nadu, India. This hospital is run by the Sri Narayani Peedam.

Facilities
Facilities offered at the hospital are,

 24-hour Service
 Intensive Care Unit
 Emergency & Trauma Care
 Health Check up

Services 
Speciality services offered at Sri Narayani hospital are,

 Anaesthesiology
 Andrology
 Arthroscopy Surgery
 Ayurvedic Medicine
 Cardiology
 Cardiothoracic Surgery
 Cosmetology
 Dental & Dental Surgeries
 Dermatology& Venereal Diseases
 Diabetology 
 Emergency Trauma Care
 General Surgery / Laparoscopic Surgery
 General Medicine
 Internal Medicine and Diabetic care
 Micro Neuro and Spinal Surgery 
 Neurology
 Otorhinolaryngology
 Obstetrics & Gynecology
 Oncology
 Ophthalmology
 Orthopaedics & Traumatology
 Surgical Gastroenterology
 Physical Medicine and Rehabilitation
 Paediatrics and Neonatology
 Psychiatry
 Pulmonology
 Radiology & Imaging Sciences
 Urology

References 

Hospitals in Vellore
Year of establishment missing